Thomas Schiessling (born 1 November 1974) is an Austrian former professional tennis player.

A left-handed player from Innsbruck, Schiessling turned professional in 1994 and reached a career best singles ranking of 257 in the world. Most of his ATP Tour main draw appearances came at his home tournament, the Austrian Open Kitzbühel, but he had his best performance at Mallorca in 1998, beating Marat Safin en route to the quarter-finals.

Schiessling now trades stocks for a living.

ATP Challenger and ITF Futures finals

Singles: 13 (7–6)

Doubles: 1 (1–0)

References

External links
 
 

1974 births
Living people
Austrian male tennis players
Sportspeople from Innsbruck